Warners Bay High School is a government-funded co-educational comprehensive secondary day school, located in Warners Bay, a suburb of the City of Lake Macquarie, in the Hunter region of New South Wales, Australia.

Established in January 1966, the school caters for approximately 1,300 students in 2018, from Year 7 to Year 12, of whom three percent identified as Indigenous Australians and seven percent were from a language background other than English. The school is operated by the NSW Department of Education; the principal is Marcus Neale.

Notable alumni

 Morgan Evanscountry music artist
 Benn Harradineathlete; Australian representative to the 2012 Olympics
 David Higginsarcher; Australian representative at the 1984 Paralympics

See also 

 List of government schools in New South Wales
 Education in Australia

References

External links
 Warners Bay High School
 NSW Schools website

Public high schools in New South Wales
City of Lake Macquarie
Hunter Region
1966 establishments in Australia
Educational institutions established in 1966